In enzymology, a methylenetetrahydromethanopterin dehydrogenase is an enzyme that catalyzes the chemical reaction

5,10-methylenetetrahydromethanopterin + coenzyme F420  5,10-methenyltetrahydromethanopterin + reduced coenzyme F420

Thus, the two substrates of this enzyme are 5,10-methylenetetrahydromethanopterin and coenzyme F420, whereas its two products are 5,10-methenyltetrahydromethanopterin and reduced coenzyme F420.

This enzyme belongs to the family of oxidoreductases, specifically those acting on the CH-NH group of donors with other acceptors.  The systematic name of this enzyme class is 5,10-methylenetetrahydromethanopterin:coenzyme-F420 oxidoreductase. Other names in common use include N5,N10-methylenetetrahydromethanopterin dehydrogenase, and 5,10-methylenetetrahydromethanopterin dehydrogenase.  This enzyme participates in folate biosynthesis.

Structural studies

References

 
 

EC 1.5.98
Enzymes of known structure